Roderick Valley is a large ice-filled valley trending in a north–south direction and separating Schmidt and Williams Hills from the main mass of Neptune Range, in the Pensacola Mountains. Mapped by United States Geological Survey (USGS) from surveys and U.S. Navy air photos, 1956–66. Named by Advisory Committee on Antarctic Names (US-ACAN) for Captain David W. Roderick, United States Air Force (USAF), pilot and second in command of the Electronic Test Unit in the Pensacola Mountains, 1957–58.
 

Valleys of Queen Elizabeth Land